Eleni Gebrehiwot (born 3 August 1984 in Asmara, Ethiopia) is a German long-distance runner.

She became German citizen in 2014.

On 8 September 2014 she won the 12 edition of the Münster Marathon in record time of 2:29:12 h. It was also the fulfilment of the qualification time for the 2014 European Athletics Championships in Zurich. Unfortunately she did not participate in this race because of problems with her right Achilles tendon.

Personal bests

Outdoor
 5000 m - 15:47.48 min, 16 June 2012, Wattenscheid
 10.000 m - 32:26.92 min, 4 May 2013, Bremen
 10 km (road) - 32:12 min, 30 March 2013, Paderborn
 Half marathon - 1:12:24 h, 2 October 2011, Cologne
 Marathon - 2:29:12 h, 8 September 2013, Münster

References

External links

 

1984 births
Living people
German female long-distance runners
German female marathon runners
Sportspeople from Asmara
21st-century German women
20th-century German women